Mabiala Brandon  (born 5 November 1989 in Issy-les-Moulineaux) is  a French football player who previously played for FK SIAD Most.

External links
 Profile on fotbalportal.cz 
 Profile on football-lineups.com
 Profile on Guardian Stats Centre

1989 births
Living people
French footballers
Czech First League players
FK Baník Most players

Association football midfielders